Yair Levy (born 11 October 1952) is an Israeli Haredi rabbi and former politician who served as a member of the Knesset for Shas between 1988 and 1992.

Biography
Born in Tiberias in 1952, Levy attended a rabbinical seminary, and was certified as a rabbi. During his national service in the IDF, he was a camp commander in the Oded Brigade and was injured during the Yom Kippur War.

He joined the Shas party during the 1980s, and served as its secretary and secretary of its schooling system. He was elected to the Knesset on the party's list in 1988, but lost his seat in the 1992 elections. In 1993, he was jailed for five years for embezzling NIS 500,000 from the party's El HaMa'ayan organisation.

See also
 List of Israeli public officials convicted of crimes or misdemeanors

References

External links

1952 births
Living people
Israeli government officials convicted of crimes
Israeli Orthodox rabbis
Israeli politicians convicted of crimes
Israeli politicians convicted of fraud
Israeli soldiers
Jewish Israeli politicians
Members of the 12th Knesset (1988–1992)
People from Tiberias
Rabbinic members of the Knesset
Rabbis convicted of crimes
Shas politicians